is a Shinto shrine in the Miyayama neighborhood of the town of Samukawa, Kōza District.  Kanagawa Prefecture, Japan. It is the ichinomiya of former Sagami Province. The main festival of the shrine is held annually on September 20. This shrine is one of the most famous shrines around Tokyo, where about 2 million people visit each year.

Enshrined kami
The kami enshrined at Samukawa Jinja is:
 , an amalgamation of the male  and the female 
Beppyo shrines

History
The origins of Samukawa Shrine are unknown. Unverifiable shrine legend states that during the reign of Emperor Yūryaku (418-479), messengers were sent to this shrine from the imperial court. The earliest written records indicate that the shrine was rebuilt in the year 727, and its name also appears in the Shoku Nihon Kōki entry for the year 846. There is also a mystery regarding the kami enshrined. The current kami are given the collective name of "Samukawa Daimyōjin", about whom nothing is known. One theory identifies these kami as being associated with Ise Province, as they are also worshipped at the Muyano Shrine, a sub-shrine of the Ise Grand Shrine. It is also possible that these kami are the ancestors of the Samukawa clan, the Sagami Kuni no miyatsuko. None of these theories are mutually exclusive. 

At present, the shrine is located on a low plateau on the left bank of the Sagami River, about seven kilometers inland in the central southern part of Kanagawa Prefecture; however, during the Yayoi period, it was located on the shore of an inlet of Sagami Bay which extended far inland from the present shoreline. The ancient Tōkaidō highway crossed the Sagami River passed the east side of Samukawa Shrine. In the Azuma Kagami of the Kamakura period, Samukawa Shrine is identified as the ichinomiya of Sagami Province, and there was a dedication ceremony at the shrine on the birth of Minamoto no Yoriie.  Afterwards, the shrine was patronized by the Hōjō clan, and in the Sengoku period by the Later Hōjō clan. Takeda Shingen visited the shrine and donated a kabuto helmet and sword to pray for victory when he attacked Odawara Castle in October 1569.

Following the Meiji restoration, in 1871 the shrine was designated an   under the Modern system of ranked Shinto Shrines.

The shrine is a five-minute walk from Miyayama Station on the JR East Sagami Line.

Gallery

Festivals

The main festival of the shrine is held annually on September 20, and features yabusame performances. During the Setsubun festival in February, illuminated paper figures are hung from the main gate in a style similar to that of the Nebuta in Aomori Prefecture.

Related information
Brooklyn Botanic Garden in New York City has a Mikoshi donated by Samukawa Shrine.

See also
 List of Shinto shrines
Ichinomiya

Notes

References
 Plutschow, Herbert and P.G. O'Neil. (1996). Matsuri: The Festivals of Japan. London: Routledge. ;

External links

Samukawa-jinjya Shrine Official Website

Shinto shrines in Kanagawa Prefecture
Sagami Province
Samukawa
Ichinomiya